On 19 July 2021, a passenger bus coming from Sialkot to Rajanpur collided head-on with a truck on Taunsa Road in Dera Ghazi Khan, killing 30 people and more than 40 injured.

References

2021 in Pakistan
Bus incidents in Pakistan
Dera Ghazi Khan District